The Ruthenian Catholic Apostolic Administration of Târgul-Siret was a short-lived 20th century Interbellum permanent Apostolic Administration (pre-diocesan missionary jurisdiction) of the Ruthenian Greek Catholic Church sui iuris (Eastern Catholic, notably Byzantine Rite) in Romania.

History 
It was established in 1922 on territory without proper Ordinary of the particular church sui iuris and suppressed in 1930. No incumbent recorded.

Source and External links 
 GCatholic

Apostolic administrations
Former Roman Catholic dioceses in Europe